Akpo Efeneja Godwin (born 29 November 1999) is a Beninese-Nigerian footballer who plays as a forward for Gombe United and Benin National U-23 Team . He formally played at Wikki Tourists.

Club career
Godwin Akpo began his senior career with the Beninese club J.S. Agonlin, Akpo transferred to NPFL club Wikki Tourists on 6 October 2021, signing a one-year contract. He made his debut in the Nigeria Premier League on 21 April 2021 in a 2-0 win against MFM FC.
On 11 October 2022, he signed a one-year contract at Gombe United.

International
Akpo was born in Benin to a Nigerian father and Beninese mother, and raised in between Benin and Nigeria. He debuted with the Benin U-23 National team ahead of the Africa U-23 Cup of Nations qualifying fixture against Sudan in October 2022.

References

External links
 

1999 births
Living people
Beninese footballers
Benin Premier League players
Nigeria Professional Football League players
Wikki Tourists F.C. players
Gombe United F.C. players
Beninese people of Nigerian descent